Cruisin' for a Bruisin'  was the third studio album to be released by Australian band Ol' 55. The album was released in November 1978 and peaked at number 40 on the Australian Kent Music Report.

Track listing

Charts

References

1978 albums
Ol' 55 (band) albums